Guttenplan is a surname. Notable people with the surname include: 

 Samuel Guttenplan (born 1944), editor-in-chief of Mind & Language
 D. D. Guttenplan, London correspondent for The Nation
 Alexander Guttenplan (born 1990), University Challenge contestant, son of D. D. Guttenplan